Robert Coppola Schwartzman (born December 24, 1982) is an American filmmaker, director, screenwriter, actor and musician. Schwartzman is best known for directing Dreamland, The Unicorn, and The Argument, acting in his cousin Sofia Coppola's projects Lick the Star and The Virgin Suicides, as well as starring in The Princess Diaries and as the lead vocalist of the rock/pop band Rooney.

Early life
Schwartzman was born in Los Angeles to Talia Shire (née Coppola) and film producer Jack Schwartzman. His paternal grandparents were Polish Jews, while his mother is an Italian-American Catholic. His older brother, Jason Schwartzman, is also an actor and musician. His paternal half-siblings are Stephanie and cinematographer John Schwartzman, while his maternal half-brother is Matthew Shire. 

As a member of the Coppola family, many of his relatives are also involved in the entertainment industry—he is the nephew of filmmaker Francis Ford Coppola and opera conductor Anton Coppola; the cousin of actor Nicolas Cage and filmmakers Sofia Coppola, Roman Coppola, and Christopher Coppola; and the grandson of Coppola family matriarch Italia Coppola (née Pennino) and composer Carmine Coppola.

Career

Schwartzman attended Windward School in Los Angeles, California and formed his band Rooney in his junior year of school in 1999. He left the band temporarily when he attended Eugene Lang College in New York City in 2001. Schwartzman wrote songs in his dorm room and flew home every month to perform new material for Rooney in his first semester at college. Most of the songs on the first Rooney album were written while in college. It was during this time that he realized that he wanted to go back to Los Angeles and pursue a professional career in music with Rooney.

Shortly after he left school, he was signed to Geffen/Interscope records in early 2002. Rooney recorded their debut self-titled album in June 2002.  They also were selected by Schwartzman's friend, Johnny Ramone, for the Ramones tribute album entitled We're A Happy Family, which was released in early 2003. Rooney opened for Weezer during their headlining tour in the summer of 2002, it was their first national support slot. The next tour the band landed was with the band The Strokes. Rooney's album was finally released in May 2003 and has since sold approximately 500,000 copies. The band had a cameo appearance in an episode of The O.C., "The Third Wheel". Their song "Blueside" was featured on the Tiger Woods PGA Tour 2004 soundtrack, and their song "I'm Shakin'" was featured on an episode of the daytime soap opera All My Children.

On November 16, 2004, the band issued their first DVD, Spit & Sweat. The hour-long documentary features interviews with the band and live performances from Los Angeles. The DVD also includes the videos for "Blueside", "I'm Shakin'", "If It Were Up to Me", and "Popstars", which was released as a never-before-seen video. Following their 2006 summer tour, the band began the recording sessions for their second album. Three songs from previous sessions ("Don't Come Around Again", "Paralyzed", and "Tell Me Soon"), were kept for their new album, Calling the World. On March 6, 2007, the single "When Did Your Heart Go Missing?" was released on their MySpace account. The single also was used in commercials for the TV show Beauty and the Geek. The album was released to stores July 17, 2007, and debuted at #42 on the Billboard Top 100 Albums chart.

Schwartzman released his first solo album, Double Capricorn, on October 25, 2011. All profits from the sale of the album will be donated to the Tibetan Healing Fund, to help build a new birthing center. He scored the 2013 film Palo Alto with Dev Hynes of Blood Orange.

In 2016, Schwarzmann wrote and directed Dreamland, starring Johnny Simmons and Amy Landecker. It had its world premiere at the Tribeca Film Festival on April 14, 2016.  It was released in a limited release and through video on demand on November 11, 2016. In 2018, he directed The Unicorn starring Lauren Lapkus and Nick Rutherford. It had its world premiere at South by Southwest on March 10, 2018.

Utopia Media 
In 2018, Robert co-founded Utopia Media, a "filmmaker first" distribution company. In 2020, Utopia Media announced the launch of Altavod, a platform for filmmakers to more easily distribute and profit from their films. Altavod originally launched in partnership with Unanimous Media’s documentary Jump Shot, a documentary that uncovered the inspiring true story of the forgotten basketball legend who developed, pioneered, and popularized the modern-day jump shot. Stephen Curry served as an executive producer on the film, which was distributed by Aspiration Media.

In 2020, Utopia Media released a 4K restoration of the 1980s cult-classic Rad by director Hal Needham. It starred Schwartzman's mother, Talia Shire, and was executive produced by his father, Jack Schwartzman.The film made its belated Blu-ray and 4K Ultra HD debut in May 2020, from Vinegar Syndrome and Utopia Distribution.

Filmography

Director
 Dreamland (2016)
 The Unicorn (2018)
 The Argument (2020)

Composer
Rooney - Rooney (released May 20, 2003)
Rooney - Calling the World (released July 17, 2007)
Ben Lee - Ripe co-writer (song "Sex Without Love", 2007)
Demi Lovato - Don't Forget co-writer (song "Party", 2008)
Rooney - Iron Man: Armored Adventures Theme Song (released March 29, 2009)
Rooney - Wild One EP (released November 27, 2009 only through private band distribution but later released on Amazon.com February 3, 2010 and was soon available at other online-only media outlets; iTunes, Zune)
Rooney - Eureka, excluding track 4 (released June 8, 2010)
SoloBob - Fantastic 15 (released via Amazon.com July 27, 2010)
Robert Schwartzman - Double Capricorn (released October 25, 2011)
We the Kings - Sunshine State of Mind co-writer (song "Friday is Forever", 2011)
StarSystem -Pleasure District EP (released October 8, 2013)
Rooney - Washed Away (released May 6, 2016)

Misc
Rooney: Spit and Sweat as himself
A New Princess (The Making of the Princess Diaries) as himself
Solobob as himself

Producer

 Clique Girls "Incredible" - 2008
 Clique Girls "Clique Girlz EP" - 2008
 Clique Girls "Then I Woke Up/Heaven Is Place on Earth" - 2008

See also 
Coppola family tree

References

External links

Rooney official site
Robert Schwartzman official site

1982 births
20th-century American male actors
21st-century American male actors
21st-century American writers
American male writers
American male screenwriters
American male film actors
American male singers
American people of Polish-Jewish descent
American people of Italian descent
American rock singers
Coppola family
Living people
Musicians from Los Angeles
Male actors from Los Angeles
Singers from California
Film directors from Los Angeles
Screenwriters from California
21st-century American singers